Following the 2017 election, Eik Dahl Bidstrup from Venstre won his 2nd consecutive term as mayor of Dragør Municipality.

In March 2021, Eik Dahl Bidstrup stepped down as mayor after he had accepted an offer to become chairman of Kristelig Fagbevægelse. It would be Helle Barth, also from Venstre, who would take over the last months before this election. 

In this election, the Conservatives would gain 3 seats, and become the largest party with a total of 6 seats. They would manage to find an agreement with the Social Democrats and Venstre, seeing Kenneth Gøtterup from the Conservatives become the first mayor of the municipality since 2006.

Electoral system
For elections to Danish municipalities, a number varying from 9 to 31 are chosen to be elected to the municipal council. The seats are then allocated using the D'Hondt method and a closed list proportional representation.
Dragør Municipality had 15 seats in 2021

Unlike in Danish General Elections, in elections to municipal councils, electoral alliances are allowed.

Electoral alliances 

Electoral Alliance 1

Electoral Alliance 2

Electoral Alliance 3

Electoral Alliance 4

Electoral Alliance 5

Results

Notes

References 

Dragør